The CenterParty is a political party in Denmark.

History
In 2008, a group of people discussed the need of a new political party. On 17 January, the CenterParty was established, inspired by the Swedish Centerpartiet and the Norwegian Senterpartiet.

In 2013, the party ran for municipal council in the local elections. The party did not manage to get enough votes for any seats.

In 2015, the Democratic Party decided to dissolve and join the CenterParty

Leaders of the CenterParty 
 2009-2010: Per Schultz-Knudsen
 2010-2011: Ibrahim Gøkhan
 2011- : Per Schultz-Knudsen

Election results

Municipal elections

References

Centrist parties in Denmark
Nordic agrarian parties
Political parties established in 2009
2009 establishments in Denmark